The Cadran solaire ("Sun Dial") is an outdoor 1967 steel and aluminum sundial sculpture by Dutch artist Herman J. van der Heide, installed outside Montreal's Rio Tinto Alcan Planetarium, in Quebec, Canada. The sculpture was previously installed outside the Montreal Planetarium, in Chaboillez Square, but was relocated in October 2013.

References

1967 establishments in Canada
1967 sculptures
Aluminium sculptures in Canada
Downtown Montreal
Mercier–Hochelaga-Maisonneuve
Outdoor sculptures in Montreal
Steel sculptures in Canada
Sundials